The 2016–17 Syracuse Orange women's basketball team represented Syracuse University during the 2016–17 NCAA Division I women's basketball season. The Orange, led by tenth year head coach Quentin Hillsman. The Orange were fourth year members of the Atlantic Coast Conference and play their home games at the Carrier Dome. They finished the season 22–11, 11–5 in ACC play to finish in sixth place. They advanced to the quarterfinals round of the ACC women's tournament where they lost to Duke. They received an at-large bid of the NCAA women's tournament where they defeated Iowa State in the first round before losing to last year's National Championship rematch to Connecticut in the second round.

Roster

Schedule

|-
!colspan=9 style="background:#D44500; color:#212B6D;"|Non-conference regular season

|-
!colspan=9 style="background:#D44500; color:#212B6D;"| ACC regular season

|-
!colspan=9 style="background:#D44500; color:#212B6D;"| ACC Women's Tournament

|-
!colspan=9 style="background:#D44500; color:#212B6D;"| NCAA Women's Tournament

Rankings

See also
 2016–17 Syracuse Orange men's basketball team

References

Syracuse Orange women's basketball seasons
Syracuse
Syracuse
Syracuse Orange
Syracuse Orange